LSV-2 may refer to the following vessels of the US Navy:

USS Ozark (LSV-2), 1942–1974
Cutthroat (LSV-2), an unmanned submarine commissioned in 2000
USAV CW3 Harold C. Clinger (LSV-2)